The 1987–88 North West Counties Football League was the sixth in the history of the North West Counties Football League, a football competition in England. Teams were divided into two divisions.

Division One

Division One featured 10 new teams, all promoted from last season's Division Two:

 Warrington Town
 Colwyn Bay
 Darwen
 Colne Dynamoes
 Skelmersdale United
 Ellesmere Port & Neston
 Formby
 Prescot Cables
 Atherton Laburnum Rovers
 Salford

League table

Division Two

Division Two featured 16 new teams:
 13 teams promoted from last season's Division Three:
 Atherton Collieries
 Flixton
 Maghull
 Nelson
 Newton
 Ford Motors
 Bacup Borough
 Cheadle Town
 Daisy Hill
 Padiham
 Nantwich Town
 Ashton Town
 Whitworth Valley
 Plus:
 Newcastle Town, joined from the Mid-Cheshire League
 Maine Road, joined from the Manchester League
 Vauxhall Motors, joined from the West Cheshire League

League table

Promotion and relegation

Division One
Colne Dynamoes were promoted to the Northern Premier League while Glossop were relegated to Division Two. Kirkby Town changed their name to Knowsley United.

Division two
Ashton United and Flixton were promoted to Division One while Whitworth Valley, Nelson and Ford Motors left the League at the end of the season.

External links 
 North West Counties Football League Tables at RSSSF

North West Counties Football League seasons
8